Stäfa is a railway station in Switzerland, situated in the municipality of Stäfa. The station is located on the Lake Zurich right-bank line.

The station is served by the following passenger trains:

References

External links 

Stäfa station on Swiss Federal Railway's web site

Railway stations in the canton of Zürich
Swiss Federal Railways stations
Stäfa